The uncus is an anterior extremity of the parahippocampal gyrus.  It is separated from the apex of the temporal lobe by a slight fissure called the incisura temporalis (also called rhinal sulcus).

Although superficially continuous with the hippocampal gyrus, the uncus forms morphologically a part of the rhinencephalon.

An important landmark that crosses the inferior surface of the uncus is the band of Giacomini.

The term comes from the Latin word uncus, meaning hook, and it was coined by Félix Vicq-d'Azyr (1748–1794).

Clinical significance
The part of the olfactory cortex that is on the temporal lobe covers the area of the uncus, which leads into the two significant clinical aspects of the uncus: uncinate fits and uncal herniations.
 Seizures, often preceded by hallucinations of disagreeable odors, often originate in the uncus.
 In situations of tumor, hemorrhage, or edema, increased pressure within the cranial cavity, especially if the mass is in the middle fossa, can push the uncus over the tentorial notch against the brainstem and its corresponding cranial nerves and can result in a brain herniation.  If the uncus becomes herniated the structure lying just medial to it, cranial nerve III, can become compressed.  This causes problems associated with a non-functional or problematic CN III - the pupil on the ipsilateral side fails to constrict to light and absence of medial/superior movement of the orbit, resulting in a fixed, dilated pupil and an eye with a characteristic "down and out" position due to dominance of the abducens and trochlear nerves. Further pressure on the midbrain results in progressive lethargy, coma and death due to compression of the mesencephalic reticular activating system. Brainstem damage is typically ipsilateral to the herniation, although the contralateral cerebral peduncle may be pushed against the tentorial notch, resulting in a characteristic indentation known as Kernohan's notch and ipsilateral hemiparesis, since fibers running in the cerebral peduncle decussate (cross over) in the lower medulla to control muscle groups on the opposite side of the body.
The landmark that helps you find the amygdala on a coronal section of the brain.

Function
A sparse amount of literature exists to propose a comprehensive overview of the functionality of the uncus. A study has indicated that psychotic-like experiences were associated with reduced expansion within the uncus between the ages of 14 and 19 in cannabis-using individuals.

Additional images

References

External links

 
 http://www.neuroanatomy.wisc.edu/coursebook/neuro3(2).pdf

Hippocampus (brain)
Gyri